The Oaxaca Mexico Temple is the 74th operating temple of the Church of Jesus Christ of Latter-day Saints (LDS Church).

History
In 1949, Arwel L. Pierce, then president of the church's Mexican Mission, visited the area of Oaxaca and expressed his belief that the LDS Church would flourish in that area. Since that time, Mormon missionaries have baptized 8,500 members in Oaxaca. The number of Latter-day Saints in surrounding areas that are served by the new temple totals more than 28,000.

Because of growth in the area, LDS Church president Gordon B. Hinckley announced in 1999 that a temple would be built in Oaxaca. After the building's completion more than 10,000 visitors toured the temple during a public open house. The dedication of the Oaxaca Mexico Temple was the first time James E. Faust, Second Counselor in the church's First Presidency, dedicated a temple. The temple was dedicated on March 11, 2000. More than 18,000 members attended the four dedicatory sessions.

In 2020, the Oaxaca Mexico Temple was closed in response to the coronavirus pandemic.

See also

 Comparison of temples of The Church of Jesus Christ of Latter-day Saints
 List of temples of The Church of Jesus Christ of Latter-day Saints
 List of temples of The Church of Jesus Christ of Latter-day Saints by geographic region
 Temple architecture (Latter-day Saints)
 The Church of Jesus Christ of Latter-day Saints in Mexico

References

External links
Oaxaca Mexico Temple Official site
Oaxaca Mexico Temple at ChurchofJesusChristTemples.org

20th-century Latter Day Saint temples
Buildings and structures in Oaxaca
Temples (LDS Church) completed in 2000
Temples (LDS Church) in Mexico
2000 establishments in Mexico